A jurist is a person with expert knowledge of law; someone who analyses and comments on law. This person is usually a specialist legal scholar, mostly (but not always) with a formal qualification in law and often a legal practitioner. In the United Kingdom the term "jurist" is mostly used for legal academics, while in the United States the term may also be applied to a judge. With reference to Roman law, a "jurist" (in English) is a jurisconsult (iurisconsultus).

The English term jurist is to be distinguished from similar terms in other European languages, where it may be synonymous with legal professional, meaning anyone with a professional law degree that qualifies for admission to the legal profession, including such positions as judge or attorney. In Germany, Scandinavia and a number of other countries jurist denotes someone with a professional law degree, and it may be a protected title, for example in Norway. Thus the term can be applied to attorneys, judges and academics, provided that they hold a qualifying professional law degree. In Germany the term "full jurist" is sometimes used informally to denote someone who has completed the two state examinations in law that qualify for practising law, to distinguish from someone who may have only the first state examination or some other form of legal qualification that doesn't qualify for practising law.

Notable jurists

Some notable historical jurists include:

See also 
 List of jurists
 History of the legal profession
 History of the American legal profession
 Legal profession
 Paralegal
 Islamic jurist

References

External links

 
Legal professions